Seidenstücker is a German surname. Notable people with the surname include:

Friedrich Seidenstücker (1882–1966), German photographer
Fritz Seidenstücker (1899–1987), resistance fighter against Nazism and politician
Herbert Seidenstücker
Johann Heinrich Philipp Seidenstücker (1763–1817), pedagogue
Karl Seidenstücker (1876–1936), German Buddhist and author

German-language surnames